Aardla is a village in Kastre Parish, Tartu County in eastern Estonia.

Military commander August Kork (1887–1937) was born in Aardla.

References

Villages in Tartu County